Arkley War Memorial is a war memorial in Arkley, in the London Borough of Barnet. It was unveiled in 1920 to commemorate World War I, with later additions for World War II. It is grade II listed with Historic England.

References

External links 
 

Arkley
Grade II listed monuments and memorials
Grade II listed buildings in the London Borough of Barnet